Boys Ranch is a census-designated place and unincorporated community in northeastern Oldham County, Texas, United States, on the site of the original county seat, Tascosa.  It lies along U.S. Route 385 northeast of the city of Vega, the county seat of Oldham County.  Although Boys Ranch is unincorporated, it has a post office, with the ZIP code of 79010. Boys Ranch is a residential community serving boys and girls ages 5 to 18. It was founded in 1939 by Cal Farley for troubled youth and is now a census-designated place. This was a new CDP for the 2010 census with a population of 282.

Geography
Boys Ranch is located at  (35.533189, -102.253684). Its elevation is 3,186 feet (971 m).

Education
Boys Ranch is served by the Boys Ranch Independent School District, containing Boys Ranch High School, Mimi Farley Elementary, and Blakemore Middle School.

Climate
According to the Köppen Climate Classification system, Boys Ranch has a semi-arid climate, abbreviated "BSk" on climate maps.

Demographics
The racial makeup of the city was 100.0% White. In terms of ancestry, 58.0% were of German, 23.3% were of Swiss, 14.4% were of Dutch, 8.0% were of British, 5.8% were of Swedish

See also
 List of ghost towns in Texas

References

Unincorporated communities in Texas
Census-designated places in Texas